Atheloca is a genus of snout moths. It was described by Carl Heinrich in 1956. It contains the species A. subrufella and A. bondari.

References 

Phycitinae
Pyralidae genera
Taxa named by Carl Heinrich